Thomas J. Ingelsby (born February 12, 1951) is an American former basketball player.

He spent his youth in Springfield, Delaware County, Pennsylvania and played basketball and football at St Francis of Assisi Elementary School in Springfield where he led the football team as quarterback to win the Philadelphia Parade of Champions. He played basketball from 1965 to 1969 at Cardinal O'Hara High School in Springfield. In his junior season he helped the team win the Philadelphia Catholic League championship, beating Father Judge High School in the finals.  The team fell short in the City Championship, losing to the West Philadelphia High School Speedboys.

Ingelsby, a 6' 3" guard, played college basketball at Villanova University from 1970 to 1973.  Ingelsby was named the MVP of the Quaker City Tournament in Philadelphia in 1972, and was also named to the NABC and Big Five All Star squad that season.  Ingelsby finished his collegiate career with 1616 points and 279 assists. He was selected late in the first round of the 1972 NBA Draft as the 27th overall pick by the Atlanta Hawks.

Ingelsby played professionally for the Atlanta Hawks (NBA) in the 1973–74 season, for the Spirits of St. Louis of the (American Basketball Association) in the 1974–75 season, and for the San Diego Sails in the 1975–76 season.

Ingelsby is the father of Delaware coach Martin Ingelsby, and coached his son at Archbishop Carroll High School. His son Brad Ingelsby is a screenwriter. His daughter Chrissi Ingelsby Dunleavy is married to Baker Dunleavy. He and his wife Rose, also have 2 other children Colleen Ingelsby Mooney and Tom Ingelsby.

References

1951 births
Living people
American men's basketball players
Atlanta Hawks draft picks
Atlanta Hawks players
Basketball coaches from Pennsylvania
Basketball players from Philadelphia
High school basketball coaches in Pennsylvania
Lancaster Red Roses (CBA) players
Point guards
San Diego Sails players
Spirits of St. Louis players
Villanova Wildcats men's basketball players